Israeli recorder player Tamar Lalo. [1] Under the direction of Maestro Zubin Mehta, she performed with a number of orchestras, including the Israel Philharmonic Orchestra. Later, Tamar Lalo relocated to Europe in order to advance her profession as a player of early music. She performs music from the Renaissance to the Baroque period.

Musical education
Tamar Lalo has been playing the recorder since the age of 7. She graduated with honours at the Thellma-Yellin High School of Arts, has won scholarships from the American-Israel Cultural Foundation (supporting talented young artists studying in Israel) from 2000 and the Outstanding Musician title by the Ministry of Education.

In 2006 she completed her Bachelor studies at the Jerusalem Academy of Music and Dance with excellent grades, where she studied with Drora Bruck and Michael Meltzer. In her years of studies she has been supporting the students and teachers struggle for opening the first Early Music department in Israel. Regardless of her focus on early music she has stood out as one of the best wind players in school winning the academy's wind competition of 2002-4. In her last year of studying in Israel she was also a teacher for young students in the Tel Aviv Conservatory-Shtriker.

In the last few years Tamar has been living in The Netherlands and studying in the Royal Conservatory of The Hague with Peter van Heyghen and Daniel Bruggen. She has also received lessons from Patrick Ayrthon, Michael Chance, Jacques Ogg, Frank de Bruine and has worked in a school project with Christina Pluhar (L'Arpeggiata).

She has participated in international courses such as Codex Faenza seminar with Pedro Memelsdorff in Barcelona and Mateus Palace in Portugal where she was invited to perform in the music festival both chamber and solo music.

Tamar completed her studies in 2012 at the Escola Superior de Musica de Catalunya in Barcelona where she studied with Pedro Memelsdorff.

Career

In the past few years Tamar has played solo and chamber music concerts in Netherlands, Spain and Israel. She has been chosen twice to play in the Fringe of the Utrecht Early Music Festival and has won the Huyghens Scholarship Program. She was invited to play as soloist with La Ritirata touring Spain and the Balearic Islands.

In her Israeli years, she performed with a number of orchestras including the Israel Philharmonic Orchestra under the baton of the Maestro Zubin Mehta, Jerusalem Academy Orchestra conducted by Martien van Woerkum (The Netherlands) among others.

She has performed in Israeli Festivals such as Kol Hamusica Festival, Abu Gosh Vocal Festival and Yechiam Renaissance Festival. She has also toured with different chamber and orchestral projects in Denmark, Netherlands, France, Belgium, Spain and United States.

Honours and mentions

 American-Israel Cultural Foundation scholarships

 Outstanding Musician title by the Israeli Ministry of Education

 Winner of the Jerusalem Academy of Music and Dance wind competition

 Winner of the Huyghens Scholarship Program

 Honorary mention in the Sitges Chamber Music Competition

References

Israeli performers of early music
Women performers of early music
Israeli recorder players
1984 births
Living people
Royal Conservatory of The Hague alumni